The Chairing of the Bard is one of the most important events in the Welsh eisteddfod tradition.  The most famous chairing ceremony takes place at the National Eisteddfod of Wales, and is always on the Friday afternoon of Eisteddfod week. Winners are referred to as Y Prifardd (literally "The Chief Bard").  The custom of chairing the bard is, however, much older than the modern eisteddfod ceremony, and is known to have taken place as early as 1176.

A new bardic chair is specially designed and made for each eisteddfod and is awarded to the winning entrant in the competition for the "awdl", poetry written in a strict metre form known as cynghanedd.  It is possible for the chair to be withheld, if the standard of entries is not considered high enough by the judges.  This was the case in 1889, when a chair made for a minor eisteddfod at Bagillt, in Flintshire, was not awarded.  The chair in question made news in 2006, when it was returned to Wales after being acquired by a local Welsh society in Canada. The withholding of the chair happened most recently in 2013 at the Eisteddfod in Denbighshire, Gwynedd.

The National Eisteddfod ceremony is presided over by the Archdruid, who asks for a representative of judges to comment on the entries, before he announces the identity of the bard, using only the pen name that the winner has used to submit the work.  Up to this point, no one knows the true identity of the bard, who is asked to stand and is then escorted to the stage.  Local children perform a dance to honour the new bard.

In 1917, Hedd Wyn (Ellis Humphrey Evans) was awarded the Chair for his ode "Yr Arwr" ("The Hero"). On 6 September 1917, when the ceremony of Chairing of the Bard took place at the National Eisteddfod, held at Birkenhead Park, England, the adjudicators announced that the winning entry had been submitted under the pseudonym Fleur de Lys.  After the trumpets had summoned the winner three times to stand forth from the audience, Archdruid Dyfed announced that he had been killed in action six weeks earlier. The winner's chair was then draped in a black sheet, and was thus delivered to the parents of Hedd Wyn. That year's eisteddfod is now referred to in the Welsh language as "Eisteddfod y Gadair Ddu" ("The Eisteddfod of the Black Chair").

The chair from that ceremony, which was made by a Belgian carpenter, Eugeen Vanfleteren (1880–1950), who had fled to Britain when Belgium was invaded and had settled in Birkenhead, is on display at Yr Ysgwrn, the poet's former home.

Winning the "double" of bardic chair and crown at the same eisteddfod is a feat that has only been performed a handful of times in the history of the eisteddfod.  Alan Llwyd and Donald Evans have each performed the double twice.

The first woman to win the Chair at the National Eisteddfod was Mererid Hopwood in 2001; she went on to win the crown at a later eisteddfod.

Winners of the chair at the National Eisteddfod

Multiple wins

References

Eisteddfod
Welsh-language literature
Welsh literature
Welsh poetry